Tuberculobasis macuxi is a species of damselfly in the family Coenagrionidae first identified in Roraima, Brazil.

References

Further reading
von Ellenrieder, Natalia. "Databasing dragonflies: state of knowledge in the Neotropical region." Agrion 13.2 (2009): 58-72.

External links

Coenagrionidae